= Abigail Tyler Oakes =

American landscape painter

- Born: Abigail Tyler; 1823; Charlestown, Massachusetts, U.S.
- Died: c. 1898
- Known for: Landscape painting
- Movement: Hudson River School
- Spouse: William Harrison Oakes

Abigail Tyler Oakes (1823 – c. 1898) was an American landscape painter. She is associated with the Hudson River School of painting and has been described as one of the first professional female artists in California.

== Life and career ==
Oakes was born in 1823 in Charlestown, Massachusetts. In 1845 she married William Harrison Oakes, a Boston music engraver and newspaper printer.

Oakes spent several years in San Francisco in the 1850s, where she was active as a painter and exhibited at the Mechanics' Institute in 1857. The National Museum of Women in the Arts states that she lived mostly in New York City, spent several years in San Francisco, and is considered one of California's first professional women artists.

== Work ==
Oakes is best known for landscape paintings. Her works include Hudson River Landscape (1852) and View of the Connecticut River Valley (1854), both oil paintings in the collection of the National Museum of Women in the Arts. Her known subjects included Hudson River scenes, Yosemite, Mission Dolores, and other California landscapes.
